Ramarjuna is a 2021 Indian Kannada-language action drama film directed and produced by Anish Tejeshwar and co-produced by Rakshit Shetty. It stars Anish Tejeshwar and Nishvika Naidu.  The movie marks the directorial debut of Anish Tejeshwar and the second time he has paired with the lead actress.

Plot 
Ram is an insurance agent living in a village neighbourhood. He is beloved by his mother and the villagers and will go to any extend to help them and also had assured insurance policy to them for their welfare. Badrinarayana is a real estate dealer, who wants to evacuate the slum for his personal profits and was troubling the villagers, However, their attempts are thwarted by Ram. Meanwhile, Ram meets Khushi, who is a law student and falls in love with her. He impresses her using a few tricks given by his artist friend Peter, a middle aged guy. 

However, it is revealed that Khushi is actually Peter's daughter, who was separated from his wife Janaki, due to a misunderstanding. Hariprasad is an altruistic doctor, who organizes a free medical checkup/welfare for the villagers with Ram and their village president Rajanna's help and also tries to help the villagers whenever need arises. One night, Few henchman barge into the neighbourhood and brutually hack 20 villagers to death. Ram deduces that they are Badrinarayana's henchmen where he along with the villagers held  Badrinaryanan and his henchman at knifepoint, but Badrinarayan denies the killings. 

Realizing that someone is behind the villagers's lives, they decide to investigate. Ram also clears the misunderstanding between Peter and Janaki, who realizes her mistake for not trusting Peter and eventually accepts his and Khushi's relationship. Janaki reveals to Kushi about Peter and ask Ram to take her to him to seek forgiveness. However, they learn that Peter has been hacked to death, much to everyone's devastation. While checking the insurance policy to distribute the dead people's families. Ram learns that the dead people's blood groups has been swapped and heads to the blood lab. 

Ram enquires a nurse only to reveal that their village corporator Gopalayya is behind Peter and the villagers' death (Peter recognized and followed one of the henchman where he finds about Gopalayya's involvement in the murders). Gopalayya is stabbed to death by the mastermind with the help of his henchman. The henchman chase Hariprasad where he seeks Ram's help, who evade the henchman and rush to Gopalayya's house only to find him dead. Ram ask Kushi to check the death certificates of the dead people, where they learn that the people were already dead due to multi organ failure. After enquiring from another doctor, they learn that Hariprasad was supplying non-experimental medicine to the villagers. 

The experiments are used in humans which is known as Human-trials case, which is illegal and also related to medical mafia. Realizing that Hariprasad is the mastermind behind the murders, Ram, along with Rajanna lead Hariprasad and his henchman into a trap where Hariprasad divulges everything that he had injected viruses into 20 people for medical-trials. When the experiment reached disastrous reports, He decide to finish the villagers using the henchmen, by making everyone believe that Badrinarayana is behind the murders, thus leaving no evidence that he is the culprit. 

However, Ram's insurance policy had landed them in trouble. Due to this, Hariprasad had to kill Gopalayya and targeted Ram. After the confession, Ram divulges about knowing Hariprasad's involvement in medical mafia where he along with Rajanna kills the henchmen and Hariprasad. After killing Hariprasad, Rajanna tells Ram to reveal the truth about Hariprasad's ugly intentions. but Ram disagrees stating that every doctor, who are dedicating their lives to stop the COVID-19 virus will be degraded and their reputation will be spoiled, thus leaving the truth to be buried.

Cast 
 Anish Tejeshwar as Ramarjuna alias Ram, an  Insurance agent 
 Nishvika Naidu as Kushi, a law student
 Rangayana Raghu as Peter, Kushi's father and artist
 Bala Rajwadi as Badrinarayan's henchman
 Ravi Kale as Badrinarayana
 Sharath Lohitashwa as Rajanna
 Appanna as Ram's boss
 Manjunath Gowda as Badrinarayana's henchman 
 Harish Raj as Dr.Hariprasad

Soundtrack

Songs

Release
The movie was released on 29 January 2021. Karthik Gowda of KRG Studios released both the Kannada and Telugu versions of the movie.

It received mixed reviews from critics.

References

External links 
 

2020s Kannada-language films
2021 films
2021 action films
2021 directorial debut films
Indian action films
Films postponed due to the COVID-19 pandemic
Film productions suspended due to the COVID-19 pandemic